Resolution for Victory Order is a Vietnamese military order. It was given to generals Đoàn Khuê, Võ Nguyên Giáp, Trần Văn Trà among others during the Vietnam War to show resolve for victory by any means necessary. It is similar to other medals and badges awarded by North Vietnam during the era such as the Defeat American Aggression Badge.

Military awards and decorations of Vietnam